Yafa an-Naseriyye ("Jaffa of Nazareth", also Yafa, Kfar Yafia or Yafi) is an Arab town in the Lower Galilee, Israel. It forms part of the metropolitan area of Nazareth, also an Arab locality.

History
Yafa an-Naseriyye is an ancient town where rock-cut tombs and cisterns have been found. Pottery finds date to the Iron Age IIA-B (late tenth and ninth centuries BCE), Hellenistic (late second and early first centuries BCE.), and Roman era (first to fourth century).

Ancient period
Yafa was a vassal of Megiddo in the fourteenth century BCE, according to the Amarna letters.

It has been identified with the ancient town of Japhia, mentioned in the Book of Joshua as a border town belonging to Zebulun.

Classical antiquity
First-century Jewish historian Josephus mentions the city Japha (Yafa) in his Life of Flavius Josephus (§ 37 and 45) and The Jewish War (Book 3, chapter 7, verse 31) as being the largest village in Galilee, and where at one time he took-up residence, providing for the village's defence and describing its capture during the First Jewish-Roman War by the Imperial Roman army in circa 63 CE.

Chambers, cut in stone, three storeys high, have been found in the village. This was probably an old granary. Victor Guérin noted that when one of the chambers was cleared out in 1869, a vase was found containing about two hundred coins of Roman emperors. According to his observations, there were two of the subterranean systems, one of which is described above, both of which have suffered considerable damage since they were first visited by him in 1870. He found nothing of the ancient town, except five or six fragments of columns, broken stones, and about thirty cisterns. The city formerly included three adjacent hills. A stone quarry, also dating from the Roman period, has been excavated. It was in use from the late first century CE to the mid-fourth century CE.

Middle ages 
Local medieval tradition holds that Zebedee and his two sons, the Apostles James and John lived in Yafa. As the first to mention this tradition was Marinus Sanutus, it was most likely a Crusader-era invention.

Mamluk period
Remains of a building from the  Mamluk era has been excavated, with pottery sherds from that period.

Ottoman period

In 1517, the village was incorporated into the Ottoman Empire with the rest of Palestine, and in 1596 it appeared in the Ottoman tax registers as being in the nahiya ("Subdistrict") of Tabariyya under the Liwa ("District") of Safad with a population of 14 Muslim households. The villagers paid a fixed tax rate of 25% on wheat, barley, fruit trees, goats and beehives, in addition to occasional revenues; a total of 2,200  akçe.

A map from Napoleon's invasion of 1799 by Pierre Jacotin showed the place, named as Iaffa.

In 1838 Edward Robinson described it as a small village, with 30 houses and  the remains of a church. He further noted it as a Muslim and Greek Christian village in the Nazareth district.

When Guérin visited in 1875, he found 400 inhabitants including Latins, Greek Orthodox, and Moslems. There were also Protestant schools in the village.

In 1881, the PEF's Survey of Western Palestine (SWP) described it as a "moderate-sized village in a strong position on the spur running from Nazareth down to Jebata. It has a well to the north side and a second in the valley to the north-east."

A population list from about 1887 showed that Yafa had about 900 inhabitants; half Muslims, half Christians.

British Mandate

In the 1922 census of Palestine conducted by the British Mandate authorities, Yafa had a total population of 615; 215 Muslims and 400 Christians, Of the Christians, 168 were Orthodox, 112 Catholics, 108 Greek Catholic (Melchite) and 12 Anglicans. The population had increased at the  1931 census, when Yafa, (including Arab el Ghazzalin), had a population of 833; 456 Muslims and 377 Christians, in a total of 213 houses.

In the 1945 statistics the population size of Yafa was 1,070; 580 Muslims and 490 Christians, with a total of 17,809 dunams of land, according to an official land and population survey. Of this, 710 dunams were plantations and irrigable land, 12,701 used for cereals, while 149 dunams were built-up (urban)  land.

In 1921, a synagogue lintel was found there, and in 1950 part of a synagogue paved with mosaics was excavated near the Greek Orthodox church.

State of Israel
In 1948 Yafa was captured by the Israeli army during Operation Dekel which was launched in July. The remaining population were put under martial law which remained in force until 1966.

A substantial portion of Yafa's population today are the descendants of internally displaced Palestinian Arabs from the neighbouring village of Ma'alul which was depopulated during the 1948 Arab–Israeli war. People from Ma'alul participated in the local elections in Yafa under the banner of the "Ma'alul refugees' party", with a platform also focused on issues of interest or concern to the wider population, as a way of attracting political support from local parties.

Economy
In 2015, SanDisk Israel opened an R&D center in Kfar Yafia.

Notable people

 Gabriel Naddaf

See also
Arab localities in Israel
Cities in the Book of Joshua

References

Bibliography

External links
Official website
Welcome To Yaffa
Survey of Western Palestine, Map 5:  IAA, Wikimedia commons 
Yafi at Flags of the World

Arab localities in Israel
Arab Christian communities in Israel
Local councils in Northern District (Israel)
Ancient Jewish settlements of Galilee
First Jewish–Roman War